Diana Davison was one of the first lady racing car drivers in Australia.  She was the wife of Lex Davison and after being widowed, to Tony Gaze.  A trophy was named in her honour called the "Diana Davison/Gaze Trophy".

She acted as timekeeper for the Tasman Series.
She Narrated part of The History of the Rob Roy Hillclimb DVD

She was awarded the Lex Davison Perpetual Trophy at Bathurst, however it was since lost.
Davison sold ‘Little Alfa’ in 2008.

She was a witness of the Bluebird-Proteus CN7 land speed record.

References

Australian racing drivers
Australian female racing drivers
Year of birth missing